Carriage Lane Estates is an unincorporated urban community within the County of Grande Prairie No. 1 in northwest Alberta, Canada that is designated a population centre for statistical purposes in the Canadian census. The community is adjacent to the eastern boundary of the City of Grande Prairie at the intersection of Township Road 714 (100 Avenue) and Range Road 54.

History 
The community of Carriage Lane Estates was approved for development by the County of Grande Prairie No. 1 on December 6, 2004 through its adoption of the Carriage Lane Estates Area Structure Plan (ASP). The ASP estimates a population of 2,191 at full build-out.

Demographics 

References 

County of Grande Prairie No. 1
Unincorporated communities in Alberta